Kelsey Media is a magazine publisher and trade fair company based in Yalding, England. Founded in 1989, it has bought and sold many publications over the years, including former Bauer Media Group magazines Sea Angler, Car Mechanics and Your Horse (which it bought from Bauer along with their websites) in July 2020.

Kelsey Media has published the following magazines:

Aeroplane
Agricultural Trader  
Amateur Photographer 
Cage & Aviary Birds
Car Mechanics (previously published by Bauer)
Camper & Bus
Canal Boat
Classic & Vintage Commercials
Classic Car Buyer
Classic Car Mart
Classic Ford
Classic Massey & Ferguson
Classic Military Vehicles
Classic Plant & Machinery
Classic Truck
Classic Van & pick-up
Classics Monthly
ClayCraft
Coast
Country Kitchen
Country Smallholding
Custom Car
Fast Car
Fast Ford
Fishing News
Ford & Fordson Tractors
Good Homes
Heritage Commercials
Holiday Living
Jaguar World
Jets Monthly
Land Rover World
Match
Men's Fitness
MG Enthusiast
Mini
MiniWorld
Modern Mini
Motorsport News
On the Buses
Outdoor Fitness 
Park Home & Holiday Caravan
Performance BMW
Performance Vauxhall
Pick Up
Pilot
Practical Pigs
Practical Poultry
Practical Reptile Keeping
Profi International
Psychologies
Retro Cars
Running Fitness
SciFiNow
Sea Angler (previously published by Bauer)
Ships Monthly
Slim, Fit & Healthy
South East Farmer
Stationary Engine
Stuff
The Christmas Magazine
The Great Outdoors
The Tillergraph
Top Santé
Tractor & Farming Heritage
Tractor & Machinery
Tractor World
Transport Cafe
Triathlon Plus
Triumph World
Trucking
Vintage Roadscene
Volkswagen Golf+
VolksWorld
VWt
World Soccer
Wrights Farming Register
Your Chickens
Your Horse (previously published by Bauer)
4×4

References

Companies based in Kent
Magazine publishing companies of the United Kingdom
1989 establishments in England